Charles Wayne Rees CBE FRS FRSC (15 October 1927 – 21 September 2006) was a British organic chemist.

Early life and education
Rees was born in Egypt, and educated in England at Farnham Grammar School. After three years as a laboratory technician at the Royal Aircraft Establishment he went to University College at Southampton (later the University of Southampton) where he graduated in 1950. He took his PhD there with Professor A. Albert of the Australian National University – at Euston Road, London.

Career
He was then appointed Assistant Lecturer at Birkbeck College, London in 1955 (moving in at the bottom as Professor Derek Barton moved out at the top to take up the Regius Chair in Glasgow). After two years at Birkbeck, Rees moved to King's College London where he spent eight years as Lecturer/Reader.

He collaborated for several years with Professor Donald Holroyde Hey on various aspects of heterocyclic chemistry. He was appointed to his first Chair at the University of Leicester in 1965, and four years later moved to the University of Liverpool as Professor of Organic Chemistry, and in 1977 he succeeded Professor George Wallace Kenner there as Heath Harrison Professor of Organic Chemistry. In 1978, he was appointed Hofmann Professor of Organic Chemistry at Imperial College London and remained there until his retirement in 1993.

Rees' research interests ranged widely over mechanistic and synthetic organic chemistry. Much of his work was concerned with heterocyclic chemistry, particularly the synthesis and chemistry of new heterocyclic rings, with an emphasis on aromatic and antiaromatic rings, and the role of reactive intermediates in heterocyclic chemistry. Recently, he had been working on heterocyclic systems with unusually high proportions of nitrogen and sulphur heteroatoms.  He published about 480 papers in the scientific literature.

Rees was the President of the Royal Society of Chemistry from July 1992 for two years. He has served on its Council and many Boards and Committees at various times; he was Chair of the Publication and Information Board for four years. He was President of the Perkin Division of the RSC, and President of the Chemistry Association for the Advancement of Science.

He died on 21 September 2006 of undisclosed causes.

Awards and honours
He was the Royal Society of Chemistry's Tilden Lecturer in 1974, and the Pedler Lecturer in 1984, and received the (first) RSC Award in Heterocyclic Chemistry in 1980 and the International award in Heterocyclic Chemistry in 1995. He was elected a Fellow of the Royal Society (FRS) in 1974. He was awarded an Honorary D.Sc. by the University of Leicester in 1994 and a CBE in the New Years Honours list in 1995.

References

1927 births
2006 deaths
Academics of Birkbeck, University of London
Academics of King's College London
Academics of Imperial College London
Academics of the University of Leicester
Alumni of the University of Southampton
Commanders of the Order of the British Empire
English chemists
Organic chemists
Fellows of the Royal Society
Fellows of the Royal Society of Chemistry
Academics of the University of Liverpool
Presidents of the Royal Society of Chemistry